Piedra (Spanish for "Stone") is an unincorporated community in Fresno County, California.

History
In 1911, the Atchison, Topeka and Santa Fe Railroad built a branch line to a nearby quarry and bestowed the name "Piedra", Spanish for "rock" or "stone".

The town was variously known as "Del Piedra" and "Delpiedra" before the name was standardized to Piedra.

The Delpiedra post office operated from 1920 to 1943. The Piedra post office was established in 1949.

Geography
Pine Flat Dam is located approximately 2.5 miles northeast of Piedra.

Climate
According to the Köppen Climate Classification system, Piedra has a warm-summer Mediterranean climate, abbreviated "Csa" on climate maps.

References

Unincorporated communities in California
Unincorporated communities in Fresno County, California